Louis Rosen (June 10, 1918 – August 15, 2009) was a nuclear physicist, the "father" of the Los Alamos Neutron Science Center accelerator (LAMPF, now known as LANSCE).

Dr. Rosen held a bachelor's degree and a master's degree from the University of Alabama and a Doctorate in Physics from Pennsylvania State University. He had never taken a course in Nuclear Physics before arriving in Los Alamos.

During World War II, Rosen worked in the Manhattan Project.

Career
While most of his colleagues at Los Alamos did not stay, Rosen remained there his entire career, and was still working there two days before his death.

He initiated and led an effort to build in Los Alamos what was then the most intense atom smasher in the world, LAMPF.  It accelerated a beam of protons to create an intense beam of pi meson (pion) particles.  It was 1000 times more powerful than any previously existing particle accelerator, and was used to study the interaction of pions with other nuclear materials. He called his machine "a badly needed bridge between subnuclear and nuclear physics".

Personal life
Dr. Rosen's wife Mary (née Terry), to whom he was married for sixty years, died in 2004.

Rosen was awarded the Ernest Orlando Lawrence Award in 1963. Other awards included the Guggenheim Fellowship and, in 2002, the Los Alamos National Laboratory medal.

Death
Dr. Rosen died of a subdural hematoma in Albuquerque, New Mexico, on August 15, 2009, reported by his granddaughter Ambyr Hardy. He was survived by his brother, Bernard; two grandchildren; and four great grandchildren.

References

External links
2003 Video Interview with Louis Rosen by Atomic Heritage Foundation Voices of the Manhattan Project
 http://www.newsday.com/los-alamos-scientist-louis-rosen-dies-at-91-1.1390149
 http://www.kvia.com/Global/story.asp?S=10979615&nav=abc0
 https://www.google.com/hostednews/ap/article/ALeqM5jj4yj37U9DWYfLMh8iNpt2MokknAD9A9Q8U00
 Douglas Martin, "Louis Rosen, 91, Dies; Worked on First Nuclear Bombs", New York Times, September 5, 2009.

1918 births
2009 deaths
Manhattan Project people
Los Alamos National Laboratory personnel
Neurological disease deaths in New Mexico
Deaths from subdural hematoma